The 1916–17 Gold Cup was the 5th edition of the Gold Cup, a cup competition in Irish football.

The tournament was won by Glentoran for the first time.

Group standings

References

1916–17 in Irish association football